The Perttula executions, also known as the "Perttula Blood Weddings", took place during the Pentecost between May 18 and May 20, 1918 during the Finnish Civil War, when Finnish Whites shot about 30-40 Finnish Reds or suspected communists. The executions took place in the village of Perttula, Nurmijärvi and were carried out by a battalion of Swedish-speaking Western-Uusimaa partisans of the White Guard. It was led by Swedish Lieutenant-Colonel Edward Ward, with former Russian Army officer Ivar Hast and Chief of Defense Ivar Ståhle as the company commanders.

The exact number of executions in Perttula is unknown, but the number of victims is estimated at 29-37. The youngest victim was only 16 years old and there were women among the executed.

See also
Finnish Civil War

References

White terror in the Finnish Civil War
History of Nurmijärvi
May 1918 events
1918 in Finland